Hoaglin may refer to:

 Hoaglin, Ohio, unincorporated community in Ohio, United States
 Hoaglin Township, Van Wert County, Ohio, township of Van Wert County, Ohio, United States

 Fred Hoaglin, former center in the NFL who played from 1966 to 1976